Wright's Tavern is a historic tavern located in the center of Concord, Massachusetts. It is  now a National Historic Landmark owned by the Society of the First Parish, Concord, with important associations with the Battle of Lexington and Concord at the start of the American Revolution.

Overview

Wright's Tavern was built in 1747 by Ephraim Jones, who operated it until 1751. At the dawn of the American Revolution in April 1775, it was managed by Amos Wright, whose name it has borne ever since. On April 19, the day of the Battle of Lexington and Concord, when the courthouse bell announced the approach of Major Pitcairn's British troops, the Concord Minutemen assembled at Wright's Tavern. Later, after Pitcairn's arrival in the Concord square, British officers refreshed themselves in the tavern.

The tavern also has earlier links to the Massachusetts Provincial Congress which met next door in October 1774, in the First Parish Church. With John Hancock as president and Benjamin Lincoln as secretary, the Congress consisted of 300 delegates from Massachusetts towns who passed measures ending tax payments to the Crown and organizing a militia force to defy King George III by arms if necessary. Wright's Tavern was used as a meeting place for committees of the Congress during the 5-day session.

Since the Revolution the building has been put to many uses. Today the tavern is still in good condition with red clapboards and a double-hipped (monitor) roof above its two main stories.  It currently serves as educational space for the Concord Museum and as the headquarters of East Side Studio Architects and Nashawtuc Architects.

See also 
 List of National Historic Landmarks in Massachusetts
 National Register of Historic Places listings in Concord, Massachusetts

References

External links

 Wright Tavern listing at New England Travel Planner
 Concord Museum signs historic agreement to operate the Wright Tavern, 2016

Buildings and structures in Concord, Massachusetts
National Historic Landmarks in Massachusetts
Commercial buildings completed in 1747
National Register of Historic Places in Concord, Massachusetts
Taverns in Massachusetts
Taverns in the American Revolution
Drinking establishments on the National Register of Historic Places in Massachusetts
Tourist attractions in Concord, Massachusetts
Historic district contributing properties in Massachusetts